Romuald Roman (July 12, 1949, Nowy Sącz, Poland) is a Polish writer.

Biography 
Romuald Roman is a graduate of the Agricultural University of Kraków (1971) and Temple University in Philadelphia, PA, USA.

Mountain-climber, teacher, skier, Superfund program Remedial Project Manager (RPM)  in the EPA (where he was an environmental scientist), UN consultant in Poland and Romania. Took part in the project to clean up Neville Island, which had been a toxic waste site for Pittsburgh industrial plants.

He writes short stories, vignettes, and essays based on his reminiscences of life in Poland decades ago (including his early days in Zakopane) and on his personal impressions of America after emigrating there in the 1980s. His book, "Zakopianski Dom Wariatow" (The Zakopane Madhouse) won the Reader's Award in the contest "Best Book in Winter 2015" in the category "Newest Nuggets".

Works 
 Przystanek Idaho (Idaho Stop) Warsaw, 2000, 
 Kierunek Filadelfia (Direction: Philadelphia!) Warsaw, 2005, 
 Ośrodek Zero. Tajemnica Doliny Syrokiej Wody (The 'Zero' Resort. A Mystery of the Syroka Woda Valley) Warsaw, 2014,  
 Zakopiański dom wariatów (The Zakopane Madhouse) Warsaw, 2015, 
 Benjamin Franklin radzi jak żyć, Chestnut Hill Press, Philadelphia, 2022 
 Aldek's Bestiary, Chestnut Hill Press, Philadelphia, 2022,

Bibliography 
 Maciej Krupa, „Zakopiański wariat” in: ''Tygodnik podhalański” no. 51-52 (1345), 17 Dec., 2015. 
 Sergiusz Pinkwart: Preface to: „Zakopiański wariat”, Warsaw, 2015.
 Michał Kamiński Endorses New Book on Benjamin Franklin From Chestnut Hill Press

External links 
 Official site of the "Best Book in Winter" and "Best Book of 2015"
 Annapurna Edition House
 Critics of the "Zakopiański Wariat" in "Tygodnik Podhalański"
 Official site of the Chestnut Hill Press Edition House

Polish male writers
Living people
1949 births